The 2014 Bangalore bombing occurred on 28 December 2014 on Church Street in the central business district of Bangalore, India. A low-intensity improvised explosive device (IED) placed inside a flower pot on the pavement outside the Coconut Grove restaurant on Church Street exploded at 8:30 pm IST, killing one woman and injuring at least four people.

The blast critically injured 37-year-old Bhavani. She was taken to a hospital with severe injuries to her skull and succumbed to her wounds. The injured were identified as Karthik (21) - Bhavani's nephew, Sandeep H. (39) and Vinay M.R. (35).

Forensics analysis of samples collected from the blast site revealed that the IED contained aluminium powder mixed with sulphur, and residues of potassium nitrate. The report declared, "This combination is highly dangerous but do not pose heavy damage". The report also found that the explosive mixture was kept in a pipe casing filled with iron nails. The pipe casing used to fill the explosive material was estimated to be around 8 to 9 inches, and the weight of the explosives around 200 grams. According to the forensics report, "A remote sensor was used to cause the blast. And the woman who was killed not because of the flying nails getting stuck on her temple but mainly due to the shrapnel flying from the pipe casing which was stuffed with the explosives."

No group claimed responsibility for the bombing. Karnataka Police arrested Hyder Ali and Omar Siddiqui, members of the Indian Mujahideen, in connection with the blast.

References

Improvised explosive device bombings in India
Terrorist incidents in India in 2014
Islamic terrorism in India
Indian Mujahideen attacks
Islamic terrorist incidents in 2014
2014 murders in India